Triple Nine (Chinese: 九九九行动) is an English language dystopian fiction television police procedural telecast on what was then the Television Corporation of Singapore's Channel 5 (today's MediaCorp TV Channel 5) from 1995 to 1999. As the station's earliest attempt in an action-based drama series, the series revolved around the lives of a group of police officers, namely Inspector Mike Chin (James Lye), Inspector Elaine Tay (Wong Li Lin), and Sergeant Alan Leong (Lim Yu Beng) from the Special Investigation Section of the CID.

The cast changed in subsequent seasons, notably with the inclusion of Inspector Sean Han (Robin Leong), Inspector Herbert de Souza (Mark Richmond), and Sergeant Yeo Lay Kim (Chong Chia Suan) from the third season, and Sergeant Sarah Chan (Annabelle Francis) from the 4th season. All 4 seasons are available on Netflix from November 2020, as well as meWatch. The series is rated "NC16" on Netflix Singapore.

Trivia
Beatrice Chia (Dr Ooi Su-Lyn) who acted as Mark Richmond (Inspector Herbert)'s girlfriend in the drama eventually became his real-life wife in 2006.
Before Chong Chia Suan auditioned and won the role of Sgt Yeo Lay Kim, she was the weather girl on Channel 5 news. Other actresses who auditioned for the role of Sgt Yeo were Lisa Ang, Melody Chen and Tammy Wong.
Mark Richmond's character, Herbert de Souza, originally had the nickname "Mouth" because he couldn't stop talking. His initial episodes were filled with diatribes and monologues which were eventually shortened.
Lim Yu Beng, Loke Loo Pin and James Nord Lim, who played forensic expert Charles Soo, were the only three cast members who stayed throughout all 4 seasons.
When Wong Li-lin's character Elaine Tay was killed off towards the end of season 3, a body double was used to portray her corpse, because Li-lin could not be reached to reprise her role.
Season 4 was supposed to run for 26 episodes, but was shortened to 22 episodes instead due to conflicting schedules and a few other problems.
 Tan Kheng Hua (Chong Swee Chin) who appeared briefly as Lim Yu Beng (Sgt Alan)'s second wife in season 2 episode 21 is his real-life partner.
 Loke Loo Pin was a practising dentist who stumbled upon acting and debuted in "Masters Of The Sea" (1994) with a one-liner. The currently-retired dentist released her biography "Accidental Actress" in 2020.

Cast

Main Cast

Guest Cast

Episodes

Season 1
Originally aired in 1995
 Drink If You Dare
 The Price of Blood
 Silent Victims
 Missing Children
 Singthroat
 Movie Madness
 Ring Twice for Vice
 Misfortune Teller
 A Long Wait, A Slow Kill
 Babies for Sale - Dead or Alive
 Spellbound
 Skin Deep
 Hell for Elaine

Season 2
Originally aired from 15 October 1996.
 Rest in Peace ASP Ganesh
 Right Time to Die
 Tough Choices
 None so Blind
 Terminal Death
 A Time to Kill
 Acid Justice
 If Looks could Kill
 Backfire
 Till death do us part
 All I want for Christmas
 Resort to Murder
 Silent Witness
 Sins of the Father
 Crazy for You
 Recipe for Murder
 Surf for a Kill
 Death of a Lion
 Death before Dishonour
 It happened one hot day
 Guns N' Roses
 Dead Man's Hand

Season 3 
Originally aired from 21 July 1998.
 Pilot
 Parental Guidance
 Stab in the Dark
 Face of Horror - Part 1
 Face of Horror - Part 2
 --
 Killer Instincts - Part 1
 Killer Instincts - Part 2
 Mind Games - Part 1
 Mind Games - Part 2
 Token Angel - Part 1
 Token Angel - Part 2
 --
 --
 Unreasonable Sacrifices - Part 1
 Unreasonable Sacrifices - Part 2
 With Friends Like These... - Part 1
 With Friends Like These... - Part 2
 Red Debts - Part 1
 Red Debts - Part 2
 --
 --
 Who Needs Enemies - Part 1
 Who Needs Enemies - Part 2
 --
 --

Season 4
Originally aired in 1999.
 Mike is back on the team and Annabelle Francis joins the cast. Mike is still dealing with Elaine's murder from the last season. Sarah is like a breath of fresh air.
 Sean partners Sarah in a ‘dog-man’ case, Mike and Kim go in search of an underwear thief, and Su Lyn tries to get Herbert to see his mother.
 Sparks fly between Mike and Kim when they team up on a case together. Meanwhile, Sarah gets Herbert to loosen up as he, softening to Su Lyn's attempts to reconcile him with his family, finally makes contact with his brother.
 --
 --
 Mike and Kim investigate the murder of a rag and bone man. While working on a drug-related case, Sarah finds herself attracted to Inspector Seah, a narcotics officer
 Mike and Kim try to nail a man who's been going around, threatening people with an HIV-tainted needle. Also, Mike finds out that Kim likes him but turns her down
 Alan and Herbert investigate a case involving a teenage girl gang. Meanwhile, Sean sets into motion the undercover plan to infiltrate a drug syndicate and find out who the top dogs are
 Mike and Sarah investigate a businessman's murder and discover that some foreign workers had been paid to kill him. Meanwhile, Sean helps Martin with some drug deals to win the latter's trust.
 Herbert and Alan investigate the murder of a man who organises the Children Karaoke Competition. A dismayed Alan learns that he's not being promoted.
 Sean is told to kill an informer, which he does so as to gain respect from the gang. But it's also the start of his emotional downfall.
 Sean has nightmares after killing an informer and, in his desperation, turns to drugs. Mike suspects something is wrong with Sean. Meanwhile, Kim and Alan draw closer to each other.
 Mike investigates a murder where the abused wife is suspected of killing her husband. Sean manages to crack the syndicate and discovers that the corrupt officer turns out to be Inspector Lee. Meanwhile, Kim invites Alan out for a date.
 Alan confides his disappointment at being passed over for a promotion to Kim, who thus feels closer to him. Mike takes Sarah out so as to help her get over Sean's betrayal. Meanwhile, Sean gets addicted to drugs.
 While investigating a case with Alan, Sean loses control of himself and his drug problem is exposed. Meanwhile, Helen tries to court Mike who turns her down.
 Sean goes on cold turkey and Kim helps him get over his addiction. Meanwhile, a spurned Helen threatens Mike.
 Alan and Mike investigate a case where a series of women are being killed. Meanwhile, a spurned Helen freaks out and Mike tries to contain her, but to no anvil. Later, she goes missing.
 Mike and Sarah investigate the case of a dead abandoned baby. Meanwhile, Sean suffers a relapse and starts drinking again.
 Mike and Sarah investigate the murder of a man who was found strangled in the restroom of a rundown hotel. Sean seeks help from Alcoholics Anonymous.
 Mike and Sarah investigate a series of brutal murders of young women. Eventually they uncover a con operation that lures women with fengshui and black magic.
 --
 A teenager holds a woman hostage in a supermarket. When Kim fails to talk him into releasing his victim, she shoots him dead. A police inquiry into the matter eventually lets Kim off the hook, but she's stabbed by an assailant on her way home.

External links
Official Site (Archive)
Andy Logam-Tan (Writer)
Triple Nine Bio

Singaporean crime television series
1995 Singaporean television series debuts
1999 Singaporean television series endings
Channel 5 (Singapore) original programming